A by-election was held for the Victorian Legislative Assembly seat of Thomastown on 3 February 1990. The by-election was triggered by the death on 16 December 1989 of Beth Gleeson, the sitting Labor MP.

Results

References

1990 elections in Australia
Victorian state by-elections
1990s in Victoria (Australia)